José Masci de Abreu (8 December 1944 – 3 June 2022) was a Brazilian politician. A member of the Brazilian Social Democracy Party and later Podemos, he served in the Chamber of Deputies from 1995 to 2003.

He died in São Paulo on 3 June 2022 at the age of 77.

References

1944 births
2022 deaths
Brazilian businesspeople
Members of the Chamber of Deputies (Brazil) from São Paulo
São Paulo (state) politicians
Brazilian Democratic Movement politicians
Brazilian Social Democracy Party politicians
Podemos (Brazil) politicians
Deaths from the COVID-19 pandemic in Federal District (Brazil)